The Uruguayan football league system is a series of interconnected football leagues for clubs in Uruguay, and is organized by the Uruguayan Football Association at the national level. The Uruguayan League is organized by the Uruguayan Football Association, both in male and female football. The First Championship of Uruguayan Primera Division was played in 1900. Since that tournament until 2017, 114 championships of Uruguayan League were played (from 1900 to 1931 all were played in an amateur way, and from 1932 professionally).

Additionally, there are championships in Uruguay that are organized by other associations, of an amateur character.

Uruguayan Primera División 

The Uruguayan Primera División, called Torneo Uruguayo Copa Coca-Cola for publicity, is regarded as the 23rd most difficult football league in the 21st century by the International Federation of Football History & Statistics.

Pyramid table

Teams participating 
The following is a list of the teams participating in the tournament.

Uruguayan championship of women's football 

The Uruguayan championship of women's football is the most important national tournament corresponding to the female branch of Uruguayan football, and is organized by the Uruguayan Football Association since 1997 from a FIFA request.

League System 
The Uruguayan female championship has distributed teams in three categories.

Teams participating 
The following is a list of the teams participating in the 2019 tournament.

El País Cup 

The National Clubs Cup, known as El País Cup, is the tournament of the Interior teams that are not participating in the Uruguayan League and is organized by the Interior Football Organization in an amateur way.

League System 
The system uses a system of promotion and relegation between the different leagues in all different levels which means that even the smallest club can reach to the top level, the Primera División. The Championship of National Clubs Cup has distributed teams in two categories.

See also 
Uruguayan Football Association
Uruguayan Primera División
Uruguayan championship of women's football

References
RSSSF
Primera División Uruguaya at RSSSF
Segunda División Uruguaya at RSSSF
Liga Metropolitana de Fútbol at RSSSF
 Asociación Uruguaya de Fútbol (Uruguayan Football Association) Official website
current tourney
Primera Division Uruguayo

     
Uruguay